Jack O'Loughlin may refer to:

 Jack O'Loughlin (Australian footballer) (1873–1960) 
 John O'Loughlin (disambiguation), multiple people